European Democratic Lawyers (EDL) (also Association of, A.E.D)  is an association of labor unions and lawyers of six European countries. It was founded in October 1987 as a confederation of lawyers' unions and gained its statutes adopted in Strasbourg, France on April 21, 1990 and was registered as an association at the Register of Associations of the Magistrates' Court of Colmar, France on July 4, 1990. The aim of the association is defending the rights of citizens by preserving the independence of lawyers with regard to any power, be it political, social, economic or ordinal.

Member organizations 
The member organizations allied in this association are:

 Le Syndicat des Avocats de France (S.A.F.) (France)
 La Confederazione Nazionale Delle Associazioni Sindicali Forensi d 'Italia (Italy)
 Der Republikanische Anwältinnen und Anwälteverein (RAV - Germany)
 L'Associació Catalana per a la Defensa dels Drets Humans (A.C.D.D.H- Catalonia)
 De Vereniging Sociale Advokatuur Nederland (VSAN - Netherlands)
 Le Syndicat des Avocats pour la Démocratie (S.A D. - Belgium)
 La Asociación Libre de Abogados (ALA - Madrid, Spain)
 Euskal Herriko Abokatuen Elkartea (ESKUBIDEAK - Basque Country)
 L'Iniziativa Democratica Forense (I.D.F.- Italy)
 Legal Team Italia ( L.T.I. - Italy)

The EDL was present at the 33rd G8 summit in Germany in 2007.

References

External links
 European Democratic Lawyers

International law organizations
International professional associations based in Europe
Law in Europe